Remember Me may refer to:

Film and television

Film
 Remember Me (1979 film), an American documentary short by Dick Young
 Remember Me (1985 film), an Australian TV movie
 Remember Me? (film), a 1997 British comedy by Nick Hurran
 Remember Me (2010 film), an American romantic coming-of-age drama by Allen Coulter
 Remember Me (2013 film), a Canadian short film by Jean-François Asselin
 Remember Me (2016 film), an American comedy by Steve Goldbloom
 Remember Me (2019 film), a Spanish-American-French romantic comedy by Martin Rosete

Television
 Remember Me (TV series), a 2014 British drama serial
 "Remember Me" (The 100), a 2015 episode
 "Remember Me?" (Dexter's Laboratory), a 2002 episode
 "Remember Me" (Law & Order: Special Victims Unit), a 2018 episode
 "Remember Me" (Shake It Up), a 2013 episode
 "Remember Me" (Star Trek: The Next Generation), a 1990  episode

Literature 
 , a poem by Lydia Sigourney (1827).
 Remember Me..., a 2008 The Soldier Returns novel by Melvyn Bragg
 Remember Me (book series), a 1989–1995 book series written by Christopher Pike
 Remember Me (Mary Higgins Clark novel), 1994
 Remember Me? (novel), a 2008 novel by Sophie Kinsella
 Remember Me, a 2003 novel by Lesley Pearse
 Remember Me, a 1976 novel by Fay Weldon
 "Remember Me", a 2003 short story by Nancy Farmer
 "Remember Me", the original title of a verse by David Harkins better known by its opening line "You can shed tears that she is gone"

Music

Albums
 Remember Me (Frank Strozier album) or the title song, 1977
 Remember Me (Kokia album) or the title song, 2003
 Remember Me (Mac Dre album), 2002
 Remember Me (Sage the Gemini album) or the title song, 2014
 Remember Me (British Sea Power EP) or the title song (see below), 2003
 Remember Me (Oh My Girl EP) or the title song, 2018
 Remember Me: Essential, Vol. 1, by RuPaul, 2017
 Remember Me, Vol. 1,  by Willie Nelson, 2011
 (Remember Me) I'm the One Who Loves You (album), by Dean Martin, 1965
 Remember Me, by Otis Redding, 1992

Songs
 "Remember Me" (Blue Boy song), 1997
 "Remember Me" (British Sea Power song), 2001
 "Remember Me"/"I Am a Cider Drinker", a split single by British Sea Power and the Wurzels, 2005
 "Remember Me" (Cliff Richard song), 1987
 "Remember Me" (Coco song), from the film Coco, 2017
 "Remember Me" (Daley song), 2012
 "Remember Me" (Diana Ross song), 1970
 "Remember Me" (Hoobastank song), 2002
 "Remember Me" (Jennifer Hudson song), 2017
 "Remember Me" (Journey song), 1998
 "Remember Me" (T.I. song), 2009
 "Remember Me" (The Zutons song), 2004
 "(Remember Me) I'm the One Who Loves You", by Stuart Hamblen, 1950
 "Remember Me", by Black Stone Cherry from Magic Mountain, 2014
 "Remember Me", by Dove Cameron, 2020
 "Remember Me", by Downhere from Wide-Eyed and Mystified, 2006
 "Remember Me", by Edenbridge from My Earth Dream, 2008
 "Remember Me?", by Eminem from The Marshall Mathers LP, 2000
 "Remember Me", by Fleetwood Mac from Penguin, 1973
 "Remember Me", by Gummy from the Hotel del Luna TV series soundtrack, 2019
 "Remember Me", by Ina Wroldsen, 2018
 "Remember Me", by Khia from Thug Misses, 2002
 "Remember Me", by Kutless from It Is Well, 2009
 "Remember Me", by Neil Diamond from You Don't Bring Me Flowers, 1978
 "Remember Me", by Reverend Horton Heat from Lucky 7, 2002
 "Remember Me?", written by Harry Warren and Al Dubin for the film Mr. Dodd Takes the Air, 1937

Video games
 Remember Me (video game), a 2013 action adventure game

Food
Remember Me (or RM soup), a regional name for the dish Soup Number Five in the Philippines

See also
 Dido's Lament
 Recuérdame (disambiguation)